Lindsay Elisabeth Frost (born June 4, 1962) is an American former actress.

Early life
Frost was born in Minneapolis, Minnesota, and grew up elsewhere in Minnesota. She is the daughter of actor Warren Frost, and sister of writer/producer Mark Frost and writer Scott Frost.

Career 
Frost played the role of Betsy Stewart Andropoulos on the daytime soap opera As the World Turns from 1984 to 1988. She also played Dr. Jessie Lane in the drama Birdland, Sergeant Helen Sullivan in the crime drama High Incident, Fay Pernovick in the drama Nightmare Cafe, and Claire Stark in the crime drama Shark.She appeared on Crossing Jordan in the recurring role of Maggie from 2001 to 2006. In recent years she also guest starred in a number of series including Lost, Boston Legal, Shark, CSI: Crime Scene Investigation, CSI: Miami, and Frasier.

She also appeared in the cult films Dead Heat (1988), as Randi James and The Ring (2002), as Ruth Embry.

On Broadway, Frost appeared in M. Butterfly (1988).

Personal life
Frost is married to video game producer Rick Giolito.  She has two sons, Lucas Giolito, a Major League Baseball pitcher, and Casey Giolito, an actor.

Filmography

References

External links

20th-century American actresses
21st-century American actresses
American film actresses
American soap opera actresses
American television actresses
Actresses from Minneapolis
Living people
Frost family
1962 births
American stage actresses
Broadway theatre people